Vasilios Stavridis (born 3 June 1963) is a Greek weightlifter. He competed in the men's light heavyweight event at the 1984 Summer Olympics.

References

1963 births
Living people
Greek male weightlifters
Olympic weightlifters of Greece
Weightlifters at the 1984 Summer Olympics
Place of birth missing (living people)